Lettice Annie Floyd (21 November 1865 – 1934) was a British suffragette. She is known for her openly lesbian relationship with fellow suffragette Annie Williams. Floyd and Williams were arrested and force fed. After the World War I Floyd continued to campaign for women's rights and peace.

Life
Floyd was born in Berkswell in 1865 to William and Alison Floyd. Her mother's sister was the philosopher Jane Hume Clapperton who had published Scientific Meliorism and the Evolution of Happiness in 1885. Their father was a farmer and when he died in 1879 he left £3000 each to his two daughters. She became bored by not needing to work and in 1888 she took work in a children's hospital. She nursed the patients but was dispirited to realise that the symptoms she was treating were caused by larger issues including poverty and poor housing.

She and her sister felt strongly about women's suffrage such that they set up a Berkswell outpost of the Birmingham Women's Suffrage Society in 1907. However by the following year they had both lost patience with the conventional means of lobbying on this issue and they joined the Women's Social and Political Union. This was a militant group set up in Manchester by Emmeline and Christabel Pankhurst.

Floyd became a full time paid organiser for the WSPU and became romantically involved with another suffragette named Annie Williams. Floyd  met Williams, in Bristol, who was on holiday campaigning for women's suffrage, from her role as an elementary school headteacher in Newquay, Cornwall.  Floyd was organiser based either in Bristol or Newcastle. In March 1912 she went to the capital to assist in a WSPU window-smashing campaign. She was carrying a leather flail which is now in the Museum of London. She was arrested and sent  to Holloway Prison where she went on hunger strike as the suffragettes did to protest at not being treated as political prisoners. Floyd was force fed by the prison authorities.

Floyd had been given a WSPU Hunger Strike Medal 'for Valour'.

In 1910 Floyd and Williams were based in Newcastle when the Conciliation Bill, which would have included the right of women to vote was stopped on its passage into law by the Prime Minister. The WSPU arranged for 300 protesters and a deputation to the Prime Minister. The deputation was led by Emmeline Pankhurst and included Hertha Ayrton, Dr Elizabeth Garrett Anderson, Anne Cobden-Sanderson, and Princess Sophia Duleep Singh. The arrested suffragettes were assaulted and manhandled by the police, but the authorities refused to investigate what became known as Black Friday. Similarly Floyd was arrested on the day but no charges were brought against her.

Floyd and Williams and Emily Davison were making open air speeches together in Cardiff, when Davison left for Aberdeen to assault David Lloyd George. The two stayed there until World War I began and the WSPU agreed a truce with the government over women's rights. Floyd returned to her home in Berkswell, near Coventry and Williams lived with her, where they started a branch of  the Women's Institute.

In 1918 some women were given the right to vote. Floyd joined the National Council of Women and of the Women's International League for Peace and Freedom noting that women's right's and peace were the most important issues.

Floyd died in 1934 after an operation with Annie Williams beside her. She left her money to create a nursing home and she left what is now called "Floyd's Field" as a sports facility to the city of Coventry. Annie died in 1943.

References

1865 births
1934 deaths
People from Solihull
British suffragists
English LGBT people
Hunger Strike Medal recipients